This is a list of the equipment used by the Belgian Land Component.

Current equipment

Firearms

Vehicles

Former equipment 

 MAP - NATO :
 Armor
 Sherman Firefly
 M4 105mm
 M24 Chaffee
 M26 Pershing
 M46 Patton
 M47 Patton
 M41 Walker Bulldog
 Leopard 1
 M22 Locust
 Armoured fighting vehicles 
 M75
 AMX-VCI
 CVR(T)
 AIFV
 M113 including indigenous variants
 Various types of M3 Half-track
 SP artillery 
 M7 Priest
 M44 155 mm Howitzer Motor Carriage
 Jagdpanzerkanone JPK
 Flakpanzer Gepard
 M108
 M109
 Others 
 M74 Armored Recovery Vehicle
 Bergepanzer 2A1
 Aircraft and helicopters
  Aérospatiale Alouette II
  AgustaWestland AW109
  Airspeed Horsa
  Britten-Norman BN-2 Islander
  Dornier Do 27
  Piper PA-18 Super Cub
 See Belgian aircraft registration and serials
 Unmanned aerial vehicles
  Northrop KD2R Shelduck
  MBLE Épervier

References 

 
Belgia
Equipment